Guinea-Bissau–North Korea relations refers to the current and historical relationship between Guinea-Bissau and the Democratic People's Republic of Korea (DPRK), commonly known as North Korea. Neither country maintains an embassy in their respective capitals.

History
During the Cold War, North Korea – like many other states aligned with the Soviet Union, or in general opposition to colonialism – provided military, political and diplomatic aid to the African Party for the Independence of Guinea and Cape Verde (PAIGC), the movement fighting Portugal in the Guinea-Bissau War of Independence. Before independence, Amílcar Cabral and other members of the PAIGC traveled to North Korea, China, and Japan and met with Kim Il-sung in North Korea. Following independence, Guinea-Bissau subsequently established diplomatic relations with North Korea on 16 March 1974. Guinea-Bissau was one of many African countries to recognize North Korea but withhold recognition from South Korea in the mid-1970s. Formerly, North Korea maintained an embassy in Bissau.

In 1977, a few years prior to being overthrown, Guinea-Bissau's first independent leader – President Luís Cabral – visited Pyongyang, meeting Kim Il-sung together with his wife. A decade later on his 70th birthday, in 1982,  Kim Il-sung was awarded the Amílcar Cabral Order by the Bissau-Guinean government.

See also

 Foreign relations of Guinea-Bissau
 Foreign relations of North Korea

References

North Korea
Guinea-Bissau